Manitoba Provincial Road 201 (PR 201) is an east–west provincial road in southern Manitoba, Canada.

Route description
PR 201 begins near Snowflake, approximately 5 kilometres north of the border. The western section of the road is gravel and runs a jagged line, at one point running along the border. Just east of Provincial Trunk Highway (PTH) 31, it passes by Pembina Valley Provincial Park. At Osterwick, PR 201 becomes a paved, two-lane highway and continues due east through the town of Altona to PTH 75 at Letellier. East of Letellier, it crosses over the Red River and passes through the Roseau River Anishinabe First Nation Reserve. From there, it continues east, crosses PTH 59, before ending at PTH 89, just short distance south of its junction with PTH 12.

Communities along PR 201

Snowflake
Osterwick
Altona
Letellier
Ginew
Dominion City
Stuartburn
Vita
Sundown

References

External links

Official Manitoba Highway Map

201